The Gregory House is a historic house at 300 South Second Street in Augusta, Arkansas.  It is an elegant two-story brick Colonial Revival structure, with a two-story front portico supported by fluted Corinthian columns.  The main entrance is set within this under a single-story portico supported by round columns and square pilasters, with a balcony railing above.  The house was designed by Little Rock architect Frank W. Gibb and built in 1900 for Minor Gregory, president of the Woodruff County Bank and the Augusta Railroad.

The house was listed on the National Register of Historic Places in 2012.

See also
National Register of Historic Places listings in Woodruff County, Arkansas

References

Houses on the National Register of Historic Places in Arkansas
Colonial Revival architecture in Arkansas
Houses completed in 1900
Houses in Woodruff County, Arkansas
National Register of Historic Places in Woodruff County, Arkansas
1900 establishments in Arkansas
Augusta, Arkansas